This is a list of the National Register of Historic Places in Cass County, Michigan. This is intended to be a complete list of the properties and districts on the National Register of Historic Places in Berrien County, Michigan, United States. Latitude and longitude coordinates are provided for many National Register properties and districts; these locations may be seen together in a map.

There are 10 properties and districts listed on the National Register in the county.

Current listings

|}

See also

List of National Historic Landmarks in Michigan
National Register of Historic Places listings in Michigan
Listings in neighboring counties: Berrien, Elkhart, St. Joseph, St. Joseph (IN), Van Buren
List of Michigan State Historic Sites in Cass County, Michigan

References

Cass County
Cass County, Michigan